Parliamentary elections were held in Northern Cyprus on 28 July 2013, a year earlier than necessary. The Republican Turkish Party emerged as the largest in the Assembly of the Republic, winning 21 of the 50 seats.

Background
The government of Prime Minister İrsen Küçük collapsed in May 2013 after eight MPs left his National Unity Party and the government lost a vote of no confidence. On 23 June Sibel Siber became interim prime minister, forming a government consisting of the Republican Turkish Party, the Democratic Party and the Communal Democracy Party. The new government was approved by a vote of 26–11 in the 
Assembly.

Electoral system
The fifty members of the Assembly were elected by proportional representation in five multi-member constituencies with an electoral threshold of 5%. Voters could either vote for a party list or for individual candidates. If they chose the latter, they could cast as many votes as there were seats in a constituency.

Campaign
Five parties with 250 candidates registered to contest the election, as well as seven independents.

Though election campaigns in Northern Cypriot elections are usually related to the Cyprus dispute, this main focus of the 2013 elections concerns about the National Unity Party's Turkish-backed economic programmes and austerity.

Results

References

Northern Cyprus
Northern Cyprus
Elections in Northern Cyprus
2013 in Northern Cyprus
2010s in Cypriot politics
July 2013 events in Europe